The Women's triple jump competition at the 2012 Summer Olympics in London, United Kingdom. The event was held at the Olympic Stadium on 3–5 August.

Greece's Paraskevi Papachristou was sent home by the national delegation for comments she made on Twitter.

Four athletes achieved the automatic qualifier, Kimberly Williams and home team favorite Yamilé Aldama, just two weeks short of her 40th birthday, hit the mark in their first attempt.  Olga Rypakova's third round jump of 14.79 led the way, while it took 14.16 to make the final.

The only returning medalist from 2008 was Tatyana Lebedeva, but at 36, she was jumping more than 1.20 m less than four years ago.  Fourth place from that competition Olga Rypakova took the lead in the first round.  Hanna Knyazyeva edged ahead in the second round.  In the third round Caterine Ibargüen took the lead briefly, but then Rypakova hit the winner at 14.98 on the next jump.  In the final round, Olha Saladukha nailed her best jump to move into silver medal position.  Two jumps later, Ibargüen bested that by a mere centimeter to push Saladukha back to bronze.  Rypakova's winning jump was 13 cm less than her 4th place jump, even less than the 6th place jump in 2008.

Competition format

The competition consisted of two rounds, qualification and final.  In qualification, each athlete jumped three times (stopping early if they made the qualifying distance).  At least the top twelve athletes moved on to the final; if more than twelve reached the qualifying distance, all who did so advanced.  Distances were reset for the final round.  Finalists jumped three times, after which the eight best jumped three more times (with the best distance of the six jumps counted).

Schedule

All times are British Summer Time (UTC+1)

Records
, the existing World and Olympic records were as follows.

Results

Qualifying round
Qual. rule: qualification standard 14.40m (Q) or at least best 12 qualified (q)

Final
The final was held on August, 5, 19:35.

References

Athletics at the 2012 Summer Olympics
Triple jump at the Olympics
2012 in women's athletics
Women's events at the 2012 Summer Olympics